Bertrand Gallet (born 24 May 1974) is a former French badminton player. Born in Lille, Gallet started the sport from an early age. He practiced football at the age of six, then began playing tennis and handball in Béthune. He chose to play badminton when he was 14. He went to INSEP in 17 and graduated in 2000.

Played for the Racing Club de France in the national event, Gallet won his first national title in 1996, and throughout his career, he had collected seven National Championships title, 4 in the men's singles and 3 in the men's doubles event partnered with Jean-Michel Lefort. He represented his country at the 2000 Summer Olympics in the men's singles event, reaching into the second round. His best ranked was world No. 41 in the singles event. In 2001, he join the Créteil club, where he had previously been a junior coach there. Gallet was part of the Créteil coach for fifteen years, then he became the French national team coach. He married Anne-Marie Christensen, a former Danish badminton player, in 2003. He retired from the international tournament in March 2005.

Achievements

IBF International
Men's singles

Men's doubles

References

External links
 
 
 
 

1974 births
Living people
Sportspeople from Lille
French male badminton players
Olympic badminton players of France
Badminton players at the 2000 Summer Olympics
Badminton coaches